Qasemabad-e Sofla (also Romanized as Qāsemābād-e Soflá; also known as Qāsemābād) is a village in Rudshur Rural District, in the Central District of Zarandieh County, Markazi Province, Iran. At the 2006 census, its population was 37, in 7 families.

References 

Populated places in Zarandieh County